Ira Shafer (March 9, 1831 – November 30, 1896) was a New York attorney and politician.

Life and career
Ira Shafer was born in Berne, New York on March 9, 1831.  He lived in California in the early 1850s.  Upon returning to New York he studied law, was admitted to the bar in 1853 and practiced in Albany.

A Democrat, Shafer served as Albany County District Attorney from 1859 to 1862.

Shafer served in the New York State Senate from 1864 to 1865 as the representative of the 13th Senate District.

He died in Highland on November 30, 1896.

References

1831 births
1896 deaths
Politicians from Albany, New York
People from Highland, Ulster County, New York
New York (state) lawyers
Democratic Party New York (state) state senators
People from Berne, New York
19th-century American politicians
Lawyers from Albany, New York
Albany County District Attorneys
19th-century American lawyers